Gwendoline was a sternwheel steamer that operated on the Kootenay River in British Columbia and northwestern Montana from 1893 to 1899.  The vessel was also operated briefly on the Columbia River in the Columbia Valley.

Design and construction
Gwendoline was built in 1893 at Wasa, BC on the Kootenay River for the Upper Columbia Navigation & Tramway Co. of which Capt. Frank P. Armstrong (1859-1923) was a principal.

Transits of Baillie-Grohman canal
Some time in 1893 or 1894 Armstrong took Gwendoline north to Columbia Lake and the Columbia River through the Baillie-Grohman canal at Canal Flats, BC.  In 1894 Armstrong returned the vessel south back to the Kootenay River.  Gwendoline thus became one of only two steamboats (the other was North Star) to use the canal.  Because North Star, being longer than the canal's one lock, had actually destroyed the lock in order to make her transit, Gwendoline was only steamboat to use the canal twice, and the only one to use it in a conventional way.

Operations on Kootenay River
In 1896 Gwendoline was operated on the route from Canal Flats to Fort Steele, BC.

Wrecked in Jennings Canyon
Gwendoline was wrecked in Jennings Canyon in May 1897 in a collision with Ruth, another sternwheeler of the Upper Columbia Navigation & Tramway Co.  Both vessels were bound downriver.  Ruth under Capt. L.B. Sanborn first entered the canyon, with 16 passengers and 80 tons of ore on board.  Halfway through the canyon, a log caught in Ruth'''s sternwheel, which threw the vessel out of control and caused to swing broadside blocking the channel.  Gwendoline under Captain Armstrong then came down the river less than an hour later, and smashed into Ruth.  No one was killed.

There was some talk that Captain Sanborn should have flagged the channel to warn Gwendoline and his statement that a log had jammed in his sternwheel was questioned.  Still, there was no doubt that the Jennings Canyon was dangerous, for of the six sternwheelers that ever traversed the canyon, eventually five were damaged or completely wrecked there.   By June 1898 Gwendoline was salvaged, but Ruth was damaged beyond repair.

Joint operations with Kootenay River Navigation Company
During 1898, Captain Armstrong and Captain McCormack combined their efforts on the upper Kootenay, with the Armstrong boats North Star and Gwendoline receiving 60% of the freight receipts, with the balance to McCormack's single boat J.D. Farrell.   James D. Miller (1830-1914) one of the Northwest's most experienced steamboat captains, commanded Farrell during this time.

Withdrawal from Kootenay River service
1898 was possibly the peak year for steamboat activity on the Kootenay River.  By the end the year, business declined sharply on the route as traffic shifted over to newly completed railways, causing Gwendoline to be laid up at Jennings from October 1898 to the spring of 1899 with two other unneeded sternwheelers, North Star and J.D. Farrell.Downs, Art, Paddlewheels on the Frontier, at 101-110, Superior Publishing, Seattle, WA 1972

Failed transfer and loss
In 1898 Captain Armstrong went north to join the Klondike Gold Rush, and while he was gone, J.D. Miller (1830-1914) was left in charge of Gwendoline.  Miller, one of the most experienced steamboat captains in the Northwest, had the idea of moving Gwendoline by rail around Kootenai Falls.  Smaller steamboats had been successfully moved similar distances by rail before, for example Marion and Selkirk.  Marion in particular had been moved twice by rail, once in 1890 and again in 1897.  The ultimate plan for Gwendoline was to run her on Duncan Lake.

In this case, the execution was flawed.  While loaded on two flat cars, the vessel tipped over and fell down 70 feet down a canyon, landing bottom side up, and was a total loss.

Notes

Further reading

 Faber, Jim, Steamer's Wake—Voyaging down the old marine highways of Puget Sound, British Columbia, and the Columbia River, Enetai Press, Seattle, WA 1985 
 Timmen, Fritz, Blow for the Landing'', 75-78, 134, Caxton Printers, Caldwell, ID 1972

External links
 Columbia Basin Institute of Regional History
 Fort Steele Heritage Town

Paddle steamers of British Columbia
Transportation in Lincoln County, Montana
Steamboats of the Columbia River
Steamboats of the Kootenay River
Columbia Valley
1893 ships